R231 is a chassis code for the sixth generation of the Mercedes-Benz SL-Class roadster, replacing the R230. AMG version of the roadster will follow. The new SL is  lighter than the previous, being made almost entirely out of aluminium. For the first time, the R231 SL-Class was not available with a non-AMG V12 engined SL 600 model.

Design

(. wider/longer than previous generation).
Engineers at Mercedes have also installed a new folding hardtop roof with a panoramic sunroof that will have as an option, variable tint. The design process began in 2007, with a final design by Frank Pfisterer and Mark Fetherston being chosen, delayed for over 2 years, and then approved for production in early 2010. Design patents were filed on 5 August 2009 using a CAD file and in German patents in April 2010 using a prototype.
Changes from last generation include all-aluminium body, MAGIC VISION CONTROL windscreen wipe/wash system, FrontBass footwell bass loudspeakers, HANDS-FREE ACCESS boot lid opening system via foot movement around rear bumper.

Equipment 

Active Body Control fully active suspension (optional) or standard semi-active suspension with adaptive damping system
Torque Vectoring Brake
MAGIC VISION CONTROL wiper blades
MAGIC SKY CONTROL glass roof with selectable transparency
Traffic Sign Assist with Speed Limit Assist and wrong-way driving warning function
COLLISION PREVENTION ASSIST (as standard)
ATTENTION ASSIST (as standard)
ADAPTIVE BRAKE (as standard)
DISTRONIC PLUS
Brake Assist system BAS PLUS
NECK-PRO crash-responsive head restraints
PRE-SAFE, PRE-SAFE Brake, PRE-SAFE PLUS
Active bonnet
Active Lane Keeping Assist
Full-LED headlamps with Intelligent Light System and Adaptive Highbeam Assist PLUS
Night View Assist PLUS
Active Parking Assist
Active Blind Spot Assist
Backup camera
Electric parking brake with emergency braking function
Direct-Steer Electromechanical steering with Steer Assist electromechanical steering power assistance

Models

SL Edition 1 (2012)

'Edition 1' is a time-limited version of SL-Class vehicle with a panoramic vario-roof, AMG bodystyling, sports suspension, AMG 19-inch light-alloy wheels, designo Nappa leather with contrasting topstitching, AIRSCARF, heated seats, electric draught-stop, ambient lighting, Harman/Kardon Logic7 surround sound system, excluding designo crystal silver magno body colour option, trim in wave or deep white aluminium.

The vehicle was unveiled at the 2012 North American International Auto Show, followed by the 2012 Geneva Motor Show.

The vehicle was available from Mercedes-Benz sales partners from 31 March 2012. Early models include SL 350 BlueEFFICIENCY, SL 500.

SL 63 AMG (2012–2019)

Edition 1 model includes AIRSCARF neck-level heating, AMG forged light-alloy wheels (painted matt black, rim flange with a high-sheen finish), AMG Performance package, designo Exclusive leather in classic red or deep white with contrasting topstitching, designo headliner in black leather, Harman/Kardon Logic 7 surround sound system, MAGIC SKY CONTROL panoramic vario-roof.

The European model went on sale in May 2012 for €157,675, €189,269.50 for Edition 1 car, €14,280 for AMG Performance package (incl. 19% VAT).

The vehicle was unveiled at the 2012 Geneva Motor Show.

SL 65 AMG (2012–2018)

The vehicle was unveiled at the 2012 New York International Auto Show.

The German model went on sale in September 2012 for €236,334 (incl. 19% VAT).

Japan model went on sale on 2012-08-29.

SL 65 AMG "45th Anniversary" (2012)

It is a limited (45 units, 5 in Japan) version of the SL 65 AMG commemorating the 45th anniversary of the AMG brand. It included designo magno graphite (grey) body colour, "twin-blade" radiator grille with blade-like slats, the surround for the AMG-specific LED daytime driving lights, fins on the wings and the hood, Exterior Carbon-Fibre package, AMG sports exhaust system (black with chrome plating twin tailpipe, high-gloss chrome inner insert), AMG Performance Studio multi-spoke forged wheels painted in titanium grey with high-sheen rim flange and matt finish, 255/35 R 19 front and 285/30 R 20 rear tires, designo Exclusive STYLE leather upholstery in grey pearl/ginger beige, AMG Performance steering wheel, matt carbon fibre interior trim.

The vehicle went on sale in September 2012.

Japan models went on sale in 2012-08-29.

Facelift (2017)

A mid-cycle facelift was introduced in 2016 for the 2017 model year. Launched early 2016 in California, the revised SL 400 (renamed SL 450 in the US) featured a 3-litre  biturbo V6 mated, for the first time in the SL, to Mercedes' own 9G-Tronic PLUS 9-speed automatic transmission.

An SL 500 (US SL 550), with a 4.7 litre biturbo V8 producing , was likewise paired with the 9G-tronic PLUS transmission. The Mercedes-AMG SL 63 and SL 65 variants continued with virtually unchanged powertrains, paired with AMG's SPEEDSHIFT MCT 7-speed sports transmission with claimed improved shift times.

Cosmetically, every SL received a revised front end, front grille treatment and larger non-functional side 'vents' behind the front wheels. All variants also received adaptive LED front headlights with integrated daytime running lights and turn signals, leaving the below bumper intake area free from lighting. The LED tail lights received single colour red or red and amber lenses instead of the red and white of the pre-facelift models.

Front and rear bumper assemblies were redesigned to align more closely with recent models introduced by Mercedes, while selected convenience and driver assistance technologies, introduced earlier on various other Mercedes models, were made optionally available, including revised Active Body Control (ABC), now with the "Curve Tilting" function from the S-Class Coupe. Externally, the SL 63 and SL 65 were distinguishable from the non-AMG variants by embellishments to their bumper assemblies and side sills in gloss black or polished aluminium, respectively. The SL 63 and SL 65 also featured trademark AMG 'twin lamella' front grilles and dual twin tailpipe exhaust trims as well as a carbon fibre composite trunk lid.

A slight revision to the folding 'Vario-roof' hardtop operation meant it would continue to deploy at speeds up to  once initiated and the luggage compartment partition, required to prevent the hardtop components, when folded, and any luggage compartment contents coming into contact with each other, no longer had to be deployed in a separate manual operation.

Interiors continued virtually unchanged for MY2017 with the exception of slightly revised minor switchgear and a redesigned steering wheel.

Engines and transmissions

The SL 500 is badged as SL 550 in U.S, Canada, and Japan.

The SL 63 was discontinued from 2019 onwards due to poor sales.

References

Notes

Bibliography

External links

Mercedes Benz website: New SL (official website)
Press kit:
The new Mercedes-Benz SL: Lightweight, athletic, luxurious
Mercedes-Benz SL: well thought-out right down to the smallest detail

R231
R231
Rear-wheel-drive vehicles
Cars introduced in 2012
Roadsters
2010s cars